A Twenty20 International (T20I) is an international cricket match between two teams that have official ODI status, as determined by the International Cricket Council. It is played under the rules of Twenty20 cricket and is the shortest form of the game. The first such match was played on 17 February 2005 between Australia and New Zealand.  The Ireland cricket team played its first T20I match on 2 August 2008, against Scotland as part of the 2008 ICC World Twenty20 Qualifier, winning the match by 4 wickets.

This list comprises all members of the Ireland cricket team who have played at least one T20I match. It is initially arranged in the order in which each player won his first Twenty20 cap. Where more than one player won his first Twenty20 cap in the same match, those players are listed alphabetically by surname.

Key

Players
Statistics are correct as of 15 January 2023.

See also
Twenty20 International
Ireland cricket team
List of Ireland Test cricketers
List of Ireland ODI cricketers
List of Ireland Twenty20 International cricket records

Notes

References

T20I cricketers
Ireland